The Balmoral may mean:

The Balmoral Hotel (formerly the North British Hotel), in Edinburgh, Scotland
MV Balmoral, a passenger ship which cruises the south coast of England

See also

Balmoral (disambiguation)